Larry Hays is a US college baseball, basketball, women's basketball, and softball coach. Hewas the head baseball coach at Lubbock Christian University (LCU) (1971–1986) and Texas Tech University (1987–2008). He was the head coach of the LCU Chaparrals basketball (1969–1975, 1978–1980), LCU Lady Chaps basketball (1982–83), LCU Lady Chaps softball (2010) and LCU athletic director (1979–1987).

Under the leadership of Hays, the LCU Chaparrals baseball team won the National Association of Intercollegiate Athletics (NAIA) Baseball World Series in 1983.

Early life
Hays was born in Elida, New Mexico, but went to school in Dora, where he played basketball and baseball in high school. He attended Lubbock Christian College and played for the men's basketball team while earning an Associates of Arts degree in 1964. He then attended Eastern New Mexico University (ENMU), in Portales, New Mexico, where he earned a Bachelors (1966) and master's degree (1969). As Hays put it, "I've always liked to say when I was at Eastern, that I averaged 30 a game. When I said that, people looked at me, and I would say '30 seconds, not 30 points."

Coaching career

Lubbock Christian
Hays began his coaching career when he was hired as the assistant coach of the Lubbock Christian Chaparrals basketball team. He was promoted to head coach in 1969. When Lubbock Christian added baseball in 1971, Hays became the program's second head coach (he played on teams for LCC in the 1960s which were coached by Lester Perrin, the head basketball coach at the school at that time). He led the Chaparrals baseball team to an NAIA national championship in 1983. In the same season, he was, for a single season, the head women's basketball coach of the Lady Chaps. From 1979 until 1987, he was the university's athletic director.

Hays was the softball program's second head coach after his son, Shanon Hays, resigned to take the same position with the Texas Tech Red Raiders softball team. He was succeeded by his son Daren Hays, after a single season as the Lady Chaps' head coach in 2010.

Texas Tech
Hays became the head baseball coach of the Texas Tech Red Raiders in 1987. He led the Red Raiders to two SWC championships, two Big 12 championships and nine NCAA tournament appearances and posted a winning season in every year but his first and last. In 2005, he became the fourth coach ever to gain 1,400 wins. On April 2, 2008, Hays became just the fourth coach in NCAA baseball history to win 1,500 games, 805 with the Red Raiders, with a 10–5 win over Texas A&M-Corpus Christi in his 22nd year as Texas Tech's head coach. On June 2, 2008, Hays retired from coaching after 38 years, 22 of which were spent at Texas Tech. His final record stands at 1,509 wins and 860 losses, fourth all-time in NCAA history. He will remain on the Tech staff in a developmental role. Hays's No. 27 jersey was retired on March 23, 2009. Ceremonies were held at Dan Law Field before the Texas Tech Red Raiders game against the Lubbock Christian Chaparrals. Texas Tech won the game 4–3.

Head coaching record

Baseball

Men's basketball

Women's basketball

Reference:

Softball

See also
List of college baseball coaches with 1,100 wins

References

External links
Bio at Texas Tech Athletics

Living people
Eastern New Mexico Greyhounds men's basketball players
Junior college baseball players in the United States 
Junior college men's basketball players in the United States 
Lubbock Christian Chaparrals and Lady Chaps athletic directors
Lubbock Christian Chaparrals baseball coaches
Lubbock Christian Chaparrals baseball players
Texas Tech Red Raiders baseball coaches
People from Roosevelt County, New Mexico
Lubbock Christian Lady Chaps basketball coaches
Lubbock Christian Chaparrals basketball coaches
American softball coaches
Lubbock Christian Lady Chaps softball coaches
American women's basketball coaches
Basketball coaches from New Mexico
Junior college women's basketball coaches in the United States
American men's basketball players
Year of birth missing (living people)
National College Baseball Hall of Fame inductees